Don't Break the Oath is the second studio album by Danish heavy metal band Mercyful Fate, released in 1984.

The style Mercyful Fate employed on Don't Break the Oath resembled a mixture of heavy metal with progressive elements, lyrically preoccupied with Satan and the occult and distinguished by King Diamond's theatrical falsetto vocals. Although very influential to future black metal bands due to its lyrical content, the music itself is more reminiscent of traditional heavy metal. The album was remastered and subsequently re-issued on Roadrunner Records in 1997. This reissue came with the bonus track "Death Kiss (Demo)", which would eventually evolve into the album's lead-off track, "A Dangerous Meeting". The album received critical acclaim, and Metal Rules named this the greatest extreme metal album of all time.

Track listing

Personnel
Mercyful Fate
King Diamond - vocals, keyboards, harpsichord
Hank Shermann - guitars
Michael Denner - guitars
Timi Hansen - bass
Kim Ruzz - drums
Benny Petersen - guitar (on track 10)

Production
Henrik Lund - producer, engineer
Niels Erik Otto - engineer
Thomas Holm - cover art

Charts

References

1984 albums
Mercyful Fate albums
Roadrunner Records albums